Michael Hunter is a Scottish composer and musician from Glasgow, Scotland, who composed the theme songs for both Grand Theft Auto: San Andreas and Grand Theft Auto IV.

He has also released music under the aliases of Pablo and Butch Cassidy Sound System. On 22 August 2011, he released his debut album, State of Flux. The second album, Circuit Brain, was released on 29 August 2018.

References

External links 
 

Year of birth missing (living people)
Living people
Scottish composers
Video game composers
Musicians from Glasgow
Scottish pop musicians